Braulio Sánchez Fuentes, S.D.B. (4 August 1922 – 18 November 2003) was a Mexican Roman Catholic prelate.

Life
Sánchez Fuentes entered to religious congregation of the Salesians of Don Bosco and after his profession was ordained as priest on 28 October 1950.

Pope Paul VI appointed him on 16 March 1966 as the Apostolic Administrator and on 14 January 1970 as the first prelate of the newly created Roman Catholic Territorial Prelature of Mixes and Titular Bishop of Aquae Novae in Proconsulari. Archbishop of Mexico, Miguel Darío Miranda y Gómez, consecrated him on 1 May of the same year in the Cathedral of Sts. Peter and Paul in San Pedro y San Pablo Ayutla; co-consecrators were Archbishop Ernesto Corripio y Ahumada and Bishop José de Jesús Clemens Alba Palacios.

On 15 February 1978, Sánchez Fuentes renounced his titular bishop seat in the course of the new allocation guidelines of the Roman Curia. On 16 December 2000, Pope John Paul II accepted his retirement because of the age.

Sánchez Fuentes died at the age of 81.

References

External links
 Bishop Braulio Sánchez Fuentes, S.D.B.

1922 births
2003 deaths
People from Mexico City
Salesian bishops
20th-century Roman Catholic bishops in Mexico
21st-century Roman Catholic bishops in Mexico
Bishops appointed by Pope Paul VI